Bieńkowice may refer to the following places:
Bieńkowice, Bochnia County in Lesser Poland Voivodeship (south Poland)
Bieńkowice, Myślenice County in Lesser Poland Voivodeship (south Poland)
Bieńkowice, Silesian Voivodeship (south Poland)